Prabhat Mourya is a Bollywood film. It was released in 1941 starring P. Jairaj.

References

External links
 

1941 films
1940s Hindi-language films
Indian drama films
1941 drama films
Indian black-and-white films
Hindi-language drama films